2008–09 Raiffeisen Superliga was the sixty-third season of top-tier football in Kosovo. It was scheduled to begin on 30 August 2008.  The season ended with the 30th round played on 20 June 2009. Prishtina were the defending champions.

Promotion and relegation
KF Fushë Kosova (after relegation play-offs), Shqiponja and KEK were relegated at the end of Raiffeisen Superliga 2007–08 due to finishing 14th through 16th, respectively. Istogu, Ferizaj and Ulpiana were promoted at the end of Liga e Parë 2007–08 due to finishing 1st through 3rd, respectively.

Teams
Sixteen teams of Football Superleague of Kosovo season 2008–09 and their position at the end of the season:

League table

Results

External links
 Kosovo Superliga at RSSSF.org

Football Superleague of Kosovo seasons
Kosovo
1